They're Off is a game show broadcast on the DuMont Television Network from July 7 to August 18, 1949.

Premise
The 30-minute show used films of historic horse races as a basis for questions posed to contestants. Tom Shirley was the host, and Byron Field called the races.

See also
List of programs broadcast by the DuMont Television Network
List of surviving DuMont Television Network broadcasts

References

Bibliography
David Weinstein, The Forgotten Network: DuMont and the Birth of American Television (Philadelphia: Temple University Press, 2004)

External links
They're Off at IMDB
DuMont historical website

DuMont Television Network original programming
1940s American game shows
1949 American television series debuts
1949 American television series endings
Black-and-white American television shows
Lost American television shows